So You Wanna Be a Popstar is a Dutch celebrity karaoke reality series that pits celebrities against each other in front of a judging panel. It's based on the New Zealand format Popstars.

The finalists
 Erik Hulzebosch (winner)
 Sascha Visser
 Viktor Brand
 Roxeanne Hazes
 Nelleke van der Krogt
 Geert Hoes
 Hilbrand Nawijn
 Jochem van Gelder
 Monique van der Werff
 Fajah Lourens
 Tanja Jess

Singing talent shows
2007 Dutch television series debuts
Dutch reality television series
Dutch music television series
Popstars
Non-New Zealand television series based on New Zealand television series
SBS6 original programming